Denmark has participated in the Eurovision Young Dancers 4 times since its debut in 1987.

Participation overview

See also
Denmark in the Eurovision Song Contest
Denmark in the Eurovision Young Musicians
Denmark in the Junior Eurovision Song Contest

External links 
 Eurovision Young Dancers

Countries in the Eurovision Young Dancers